Torpoint East was an electoral division of Cornwall in the United Kingdom which returned one member to sit on Cornwall Council between 2009 and 2021. It was abolished at the 2021 local elections, being succeeded by Torpoint.

Councillors

Extent
Torpoint East covered the east of the town of Torpoint, including the docks of the Torpoint Ferry. The division was slightly affected by boundary changes at the 2013 election. From 2009 to 2013, the division covered 105 hectares in total; after redistricting, it covered 106 hectares.

Election results

2017 election

2013 election

2009 election

References

Electoral divisions of Cornwall Council